Sciadopitys verticillata, the  or Japanese umbrella-pine, is a unique conifer endemic to Japan. It is the sole living member of the family Sciadopityaceae and genus Sciadopitys, a living fossil with no close relatives. The oldest fossils of Sciadopitys are from the Late Cretaceous of Japan, and the genus was widespread in Laurasia during most of the Cenozoic, especially in Europe until the Pliocene.

Taxonomy 
Molecular evidence indicates that Sciadopityaceae is the sister group to a clade comprising Taxaceae and Cupressaceae, and has an extremely ancient divergence, having diverged from the rest of the conifers during the early mid-Permian; this would also make it a survivor of the Permian–Triassic extinction event.

There is inconsistent evidence regarding the plant family which produced Baltic amber. Both macrofossil and microfossil evidence suggest a Pinus relative, whereas chemical and infrared microspectroscopy evidence suggest relatives of either Agathis or Sciadopitys.

Etymology
The genus name Sciadopitys comes from Greek  meaning 'umbrella' and  meaning 'pine'. The species name verticillata is a descriptive epithet meaning 'whorled'.

Description

It is an evergreen tree that can grow 15–27 m tall, with brown main shoots bearing whorls of 7–12 cm long flexible green cladodes that look like, and perform the function of, leaves, but are actually composed of stem tissues. The cones are 6–11 cm long, mature in about 18 months, with flattish scales that open to release the seeds.

History
The plant was first introduced to the UK by John Gould Veitch in September 1860. Considered attractive, this tree is popular in gardens, despite its slow growth rate. It has gained the Royal Horticultural Society's Award of Garden Merit.

A stylized representation of the tree (known in Japanese as ) was chosen as the Japanese Imperial crest for the Akishino branch of the Imperial Family.

Gallery

References

External links

 Arboretum de Villardebelle Photos: foliage, immature cones
 Arboretum de Villardebelle Photo: mature cone
American Conifer Society
 Conifers of UBC
 Gymnosperm Database
 Photos of plant habit
 Images: Cone,Leaf,Seeds Flavon's Wild herb and Alpine plants

Pinales
Endemic flora of Japan
Trees of Japan
Plants described in 1784
Garden plants of Asia
Ornamental trees
Threatened flora of Asia
Vulnerable plants
Carnian first appearances
Extant Late Triassic first appearances
Five sacred trees of Kiso